is a PlayStation 2 action/beat 'em up video game from Bandai, released in Japan on August 25, 2005. It has an original story based on the anime series Cowboy Bebop.

Story
The game follows an original story set in the Cowboy Bebop universe. Its events center around a search for a space pirate's treasure, a mysterious song called Diamonds, and a mysterious organization that stands in the way of the Bebop crew.

Gameplay
Playable characters include Spike, Faye, and Jet, (each of whom are voiced by their respective voice actors from the anime series) while Ed provides objectives, advice, and moral support. Ein appears alongside Ed as well. Action occurs on foot with both hand-to-hand and shooting segments, often with small puzzles to solve, as well as items to search for (either essential to the plot or bonus items that appear in the gallery). Certain sections of the game require piloting spacecraft and, in one section, a boat. Gameplay is punctuated by long cutscenes that develop the story. There is also a blackjack mini-game featuring Spike and Jet as rotating dealers; this provides a way to earn additional money to unlock bonuses, such as songs for the music player and character profiles.

Music
Three new songs were composed by Yoko Kanno, famous for her music in the series. The anime's OST is reused for the game. Three songs performed by Italian vocalist Ilaria Graziano were released on the Tank! THE! BEST! album.

References

External links
 

2005 video games
Bandai games
Cowboy Bebop
Japan-exclusive video games
PlayStation 2 games
PlayStation 2-only games
Space Western video games
Video games based on anime and manga
Video games developed in Japan
Video games scored by Yoko Kanno
Video games with cel-shaded animation